Bernd Kaina, born on 7 January 1950 in Drewitz, is a German biologist and toxicologist. His research is devoted to DNA damage and repair, DNA damage response, genotoxic signaling and cell death induced by carcinogenic DNA damaging insults.

Education 
Kaina completed his degree in biology at the Martin Luther University of Halle-Wittenberg, where he also completed his PhD thesis on the effects of the neurotropic carcinogen N-methyl-N-nitrosourea on human cells. 
From 1975 to 1984, he was a project leader at the Central Institute for Genetics and Crop Plant Research in Gatersleben and focused on the genotoxic effect of alkylating agents and adaptive response in various experimental systems.
From 1984 to 1985, he was a scholarship holder of the European Community at the Institute of Molecular Biology in Leiden, Netherlands, and afterwards, from 1985 to 1987, he was a guest researcher at the German Cancer Research Centre in Heidelberg, Germany.
As a Heisenberg Fellow of the German Research Foundation (DFG), he moved to the Institute of Genetics and Toxicology at the Nuclear Research Centre in Karlsruhe. From there, he was appointed as full professor and Head of Division of Applied Toxicology at the Institute of Toxicology of the Johannes Gutenberg-University in Mainz, Germany. Since 2004, he is the director of the Institute of Toxicology at the University Medical Centre of the Johannes Gutenberg-University in Mainz.

Research 
Kaina made significant contributions to our understanding of the effects of alkylating carcinogens and chemotherapeutic agents. He identified the repair enzyme O-6-methylguanine-DNA methyltransferase (MGMT) as a protection mechanism against the killing, clastogenic, recombinogenic and carcinogenic effects of alkylating carcinogens. In a translational research program, his group studied the importance of DNA repair in drug resistance of glioblastomas, malignant melanomas and other tumour types. He also contributed to a deeper insight of the mutagenic and cytotoxic effect of UV light, ionizing radiation and chemical genotoxins, assessed the regulation of repair genes and showed that specific DNA repair functions can be induced following genotoxic stress, thus contributing to the cells’ adaptation to these detrimental exposure. He demonstrated a repair defect in immunocompetent cells (monocytes) and assessed the regulation of repair genes by cytokines. He is also engaged in studies on the genotoxic effects of TCM drugs such as artesunate. He contributed to more than 300 publications in internationally respected journals and books.

Awards and honours 
 Frits Sobels Award of the European Environmental Mutagene and Genomics Society (2021)
  Ulrich-Hagen Award of the German Society for Radiation Biology (2014)
  Toxicology Award of the German Association for Experimental and Clinical Pharmacology and Toxicology (2012)
  German Cancer Award, experimental part (2011)
 Research Award of the German Environmental Mutagen Society (2009)
 Heisenberg Fellow of the German Research Foundation

Selected publications

References 

 Scientific autobiography in A. Philippu (edt), Berenkamp Verlag, 2004
 Cover legend: International Journal of Oncology 2008
 Ulrich-Hagen Prize 2014 
 German Cancer Aid Prize 2011 
 Prize for research on DNA repair 2010

External links 
 Institute of Toxicology, University Medical Centre, Mainz, Germany
 Bernd Kaina's list of publications in PubMed

21st-century German biologists
German toxicologists
Johannes Gutenberg University Mainz
1950 births
Living people
20th-century German biologists